Taemasosteus is an extinct genus of arthrodire placoderm.  Its fossils have been found in Emsian-aged marine strata in New South Wales, Australia. It contains two species, T. novaustrocambricus, and T. maclartiensis.

The genus (and a monotypic family, "Taemasosteidae") was originally erected on the basis of "an imperfect" paranuchal, though, more specimens were found, eventually leading "Taemasosteidae" to be subsumed into Buchanosteidae.  Even so, the reconstructed anatomy leads some researchers  to conclude that Taemasosteus is close to the ancestry of Homostiidae.  These researchers  place Taemasosteus as the sister taxon of Homostiidae (or a select group of the better known homostiid genera) within the taxon Migmatocephala.

References

Buchanosteidae
Placoderms of Australia